Opacionka  is a village in the administrative district of Gmina Brzostek, within Dębica County, Subcarpathian Voivodeship, in south-eastern Poland.

The village has an approximate population of 450.

References

Opacionka